Andrew Gordon-Brown (born 5 April 1967) is a South African rower. He competed in the men's eight event at the 1992 Summer Olympics.

He attended Hyde Park High School in Johannesburg, the University of Cape Town and later Keble College, Oxford. After a career as a media analyst, Gordon-Brown entered education, teaching at Radley College, and serving as pastoral deputy head at Stonyhurst. Since 2013, he has worked for the Methodist Independent Schools Trust, firstly at Truro School where he was appointed headteacher in 2013,  and from 1 September 2020, Kingswood School.

References

External links
 

1967 births
Living people
South African male rowers
Olympic rowers of South Africa
Rowers at the 1992 Summer Olympics
Place of birth missing (living people)